Thomas Bass (born 1951) is an American writer.

Thomas Bass may also refer to:
Tom Bass (American football) (born 1936), American football coach
Tom Bass (politician) (1927–2019), American politician in Texas
Tom Bass (sculptor) (1916–2010), Australian sculptor
Tom Bass (horse trainer) (1859–1934), American horse trainer
T. J. Bass (1932–2011), American author and physician
Thomas Lee Bass (born 1962), American musician known as Tommy Lee

See also